Mancha (Quechua for fear)  is a  mountain in the Bolivian Andes. It is located in the Potosí Department, Daniel Campos Province, Llica Municipality. Mancha lies between the Uyuni salt flat in the east and the Napa salt flat in the west. The highest neighboring mountains are Thuwa in the west and Jaruma in the north-west.

References 

Mountains of Potosí Department